The Cherohala Skyway is a  National Scenic Byway and National Forest Scenic Byway that connects Tellico Plains, Tennessee to Robbinsville, North Carolina in the southeastern United States. Its name is a portmanteau of Cherokee and Nantahala, the two national forests through which it passes.  Along with multiple vistas and overlooks, the skyway provides easy vehicular access to various protected and recreational areas of the Unicoi Mountains, including the Citico Creek Wilderness, the Bald River Gorge Wilderness, and the remote interior of the Joyce Kilmer Memorial Forest.

Planning for the Cherohala Skyway began in 1958 and the road was completed on October 12, 1996 at a final cost of about $100,000,000. The North Carolina half of the skyway terminates near the south shore of Lake Santeetlah.

Route description

Skyway highlights
 Santeetlah Gap (Mile 0) — junction with Kilmer Road, which accesses Joyce Kilmer Memorial Forest
 Hooper Cove (Mile 2) — picnic area
 Shute Cove (Mile 3) — picnic area
 Huckleberry Knob (Mile 9) — short trail to the summit of Huckleberry Knob (elev. )
 Hooper Bald (Mile 10) — short trail to the summit of Hooper Bald (elev. )
 Santeetlah Overlook (Mile 11) —  view of the upper Santeetlah Creek watershed
 Big Junction Overlook (Mile 12) — View south from the  gap between Haw Knob and Big Junction
 Stratton Ridge (Mile 16) — picnic area; Benton MacKaye Trail access
 Cherohala Skyway Welcome Plaza (Mile 17) — picnic area; connection to Forest Service Roads 81/Old Santeetlah Road and 217/North River Road
 Unicoi Crest (Mile 18) — Tennessee-North Carolina state line, view of the Tellico River valley
 Falls Branch Falls Trail (Mile 21) — short trail through a patch of old growth forest to a  cascade waterfall
 Lake View Overlook (Mile 25)
 Turkey Creek Overlook (Mile 27)
 Forest Service Road 345/Indian Boundary Road (Mile 29) to Indian Boundary Lake campground 
 Forest Service Road 210/River Road (Mile 39) to Tellico District Ranger Station and Bald River Falls
 Cherohala Skyway Visitor Center and Charles Hall Museum (Mile 43)

History

References

External links

 
 Cherohala.org - official website
 Tellico Plains Chamber of Commerce - Cherohala Skyway info, photos, maps, visitor info
 Drive Among The Clouds - pictures, maps, and information
 Cherohala Skyway Visitor Center: A Dream Come True!  - the building and dedication of the TN Visitor Center in Monroe County.
 Cherohala.com - commercial site with much good information, history, maps, and pictures.
 Tail of the Dragon - tips and information on driving the Cherohala

National Scenic Byways
Transportation in Monroe County, Tennessee
Transportation in Graham County, North Carolina
National Forest Scenic Byways
Tourist attractions in Monroe County, Tennessee
Tourist attractions in Graham County, North Carolina